The Ismay Jail is a National Registered Historic Place located in Ismay, Montana.  It was added to the Register on June 4, 1997.

It is a small jail which was built in 1909. It is built of red brick on a concrete slab, and it has a barrel form concrete roof. It has one  window on each of its west and north sides.

References

Jails on the National Register of Historic Places in Montana
Government buildings completed in 1909
National Register of Historic Places in Custer County, Montana
1909 establishments in Montana